Quavious Keyate Marshall (born April 2, 1991), known professionally as Quavo, is an American rapper, singer, songwriter and record producer. He is best known as the co-founder and frontman of hip hop group Migos. Quavo is the uncle of late fellow Migos member Takeoff, and cousin of Offset. He is also a partial owner of the FCF Glacier Boyz.

Outside of Migos, Quavo has been featured on several U.S. top 10 hits, including Post Malone's "Congratulations", which was later certified Diamond by the Recording Industry Association of America (RIAA); as well as DJ Khaled's "No Brainer" and "I'm the One", the latter of which peaked at number one on the Billboard Hot 100. In 2018, he released his debut solo album Quavo Huncho, which peaked at number 2 on the Billboard 200.

Early life 
Quavious Keyate Marshall was born on April 2, 1991, in Athens, Georgia. The three members of Migos grew up together in Gwinnett County, a mostly suburban area 30–40 minutes northeast of Atlanta.
Quavo attended Berkmar High School and was the starting quarterback of its football team during the 2009 season, his senior year. Berkmar went 1–9 in the 2009 season, and Quavo went 19-of-25 for 201 yards and three touchdowns for the first win of the season. Quavo previously held the record by completing 28 passes in a game back in 2009. Despite finishing the football season for his senior year, Quavo dropped out of Berkmar months before graduation.

Career
Migos was formed in 2008 by Quavo and fellow rappers Takeoff and Offset. The three members are directly related and were raised together by Quavo's mother. Quavo was Takeoff's uncle, and Offset is Quavo's cousin. The group was originally known as Polo Club and is from Lawrenceville, Georgia. They changed their name to "Migos" after deciding Polo Club was too generic. The group released their first full-length project, a mixtape titled Juug Season, on August 25, 2011. They followed with the mixtape No Label, on June 1, 2012.

Migos rose to prominence in 2013 after the release of their single "Versace". The song was remixed by Canadian rapper Drake, peaking at number 99 on the Billboard Hot 100 chart and number 31 on the Hot R&B/Hip-Hop Songs. Quavo had his first lead single as a solo artist with the song "Champions" featuring several other artists. The song peaked at number 71 on the Billboard Hot 100.

After the success of Migos' second studio album Culture, which reached number one on the US Billboard 200 chart, Quavo was subsequently featured on several popular songs outside of Migos, including "Congratulations", "I'm the One", "Portland" and "No Brainer". In an interview with GQ, Houston-based rapper Travis Scott, with whom Quavo previously worked on the Young Thug collaboration "Pick Up the Phone", revealed he had a collaborative album with Quavo in the works.

In April 2017, Quavo was featured on The Fate of the Furious: The Album on the song "Go Off" with Lil Uzi Vert and Travis Scott. The song was eventually certified Gold by the RIAA. Quavo also released "Ice Tray" with Lil Yachty on December 14, 2017. The song peaked at number 74 on the Billboard Hot 100.

On December 21, 2017, Quavo announced that he would release Huncho Jack, Jack Huncho with Travis Scott on December 22, 2017 without any prior promotion. The album debuted at number 3 on the Billboard 200 and had seven tracks chart on the Billboard Hot 100.

On January 26, 2018, Migos released Culture II. Following this, Quavo announced an upcoming solo project titled 
Quavo Huncho to be released in October. It was supported by three singles, "Workin Me", "Lamb Talk" and "Bubble Gum", with "Workin Me" peaking at 52 on the Billboard Hot 100, becoming Quavo's highest charting single as a solo artist. The album was released on October 12, 2018 through Capitol Records, Motown, and Quality Control Music and features guest appearances from 21 Savage, Drake, Saweetie, Madonna, Cardi B, Lil Baby, Travis Scott, Normani, Davido, and Kid Cudi.

On May 18, 2019, Quavo performed "Future" alongside Madonna at the grand final of the Eurovision Song Contest 2019.

On February 7, 2020, Quavo was featured on the song "Intentions" from Justin Bieber's  fifth studio album Changes. The song peaked at number five on the Billboard Hot 100. In the following year, Migos released their fourth album, Culture III.

In October 2022, a possible disbandment of Migos became the subject of speculation based on reports that Quavo's ex-girlfriend Saweetie had slept with Offset. Following this, Quavo and Takeoff formed a super duo, Unc & Phew and went on to release a collaborative album titled Only Built for Infinity Links on October 7, 2022 without Offset's input. During an interview with the Big Facts podcast, Quavo stated that he would like to see his and Takeoff's career "as a duo".

On November 1, 2022, less than a month after the release of the duo's first album, Takeoff was shot and killed while with Quavo and others at the 810 Billiards & Bowling in Houston, Texas.

Other ventures

Acting
Quavo along with the members of Migos made his TV debut after an appearance on an episode of Donald Glover's series Atlanta. The episode aired on September 13, 2016, under the title "Go For Broke". He also made a cameo appearance on the "Dreamers" episode of fox's musical drama television series Star in 2018.

In 2019, he guest-starred in the fifth-season finale of ABC's Black-ish and HBO's Ballers. In the following year, he along with Billie Eilish, Big Sean, DJ Khaled and Usher appeared on the finale episode of Justin Bieber: Seasons, a YouTube docu-series about Canadian singer Justin Bieber. He also made a guest appearance on the sophomore season of Narcos: Mexico.

Quavo appeared in the thriller film Savage Salvation directed by Randall Emmett as Coyote; which released on December 2, 2022.

NBA All-Star Celebrity Games
Quavo received the MVP Award during the 2018 NBA All-Star Celebrity Game after a 19-point performance and victory. In 2019, Quavo played on the "Away" roster during the NBA All-Star Celebrity Game at the Bojangles' Coliseum in Charlotte, North Carolina, and again during the 2020 All-Star Celebrity Game in Chicago.

Fan Controlled Football League
Quavo is one of four partial owners of the FCF Glacier Boyz, a team in the Fan Controlled Football League.

 Personal life 
On April 18, 2015, authorities stopped a Migos concert at Georgia Southern University and arrested all three members of the group, as well as several members of their entourage. Quavo was charged with possession of an unspecified Schedule II narcotic, possession of marijuana, possession of a firearm in a school safety zone, and possession of a firearm during the commission of a crime. He was released from jail on bond, and later pleaded no contest to misdemeanor marijuana charges and received a 12-month sentence, which was suspended based on payment of fines.

In 2017, Quavo briefly dated actress and model Karrueche Tran.

Quavo began dating Saweetie in September 2018. On March 19, 2021, Saweetie confirmed via social media that she and Quavo are no longer in a relationship. She also mentioned on social media that Quavo had been unfaithful, writing "Presents don't band aid scars and the love isn't real when the intimacy is given to other women." In late March 2021, video footage surfaced showing the pair in a physical altercation that allegedly happened in 2020.

In May 2020, Quavo announced on his Instagram account that he had graduated from high school after dropping out 11 years earlier.

In December 2021, Quavo was sued for his alleged involvement in the assault of a limo driver earlier in July 2021.

Murder of Takeoff
Quavo was one of the main eyewitnesses for Takeoff's murder in the early morning hours of November 1, 2022. He, Takeoff, and about 39 other people gathered outside of the bowling alley at 810 Billiards and Bowling located in Houston, Texas after a private party ended there at around 1:00 CDT, according to Houston's KHOU-11 TV. Quavo was not injured during the shooting, although he reportedly fainted afterward and had to be carried to a vehicle. Two other people, 24-year-old Joshua "Wash" Washington (a business associate of Quavo) and a 23-year-old woman, suffered non-life-threatening injuries during the shooting.

 Discography 

Studio albumsQuavo Huncho (2018)

Collaborative albumsHuncho Jack, Jack Huncho  (2017)Only Built for Infinity Links'' (with Takeoff) (2022)

Filmography

Film roles

Awards and nominations

References

External links

1991 births
Living people
21st-century African-American male singers
21st-century American rappers
African-American male rappers
African-American male singer-songwriters
African-American record producers
American hip hop record producers
American hip hop singers
Capitol Records artists
Migos members
Motown artists
Mumble rappers
People from Lawrenceville, Georgia
Quality Control artists
Rappers from Georgia (U.S. state)
Record producers from Georgia (U.S. state)
Singers from Georgia (U.S. state)
Songwriters from Athens, Georgia
Southern hip hop musicians
Trap musicians